Wilhelm Brenna (born 8 October 1979) is a retired Norwegian ski jumper.

In the World Cup he finished once among the top 15, with a thirteenth place from Kuopio in March 1997. He became world junior champion in the normal hill the same year. He finished third overall in the Continental Cup in the 1998/99 season.

References

1979 births
Living people
Norwegian male ski jumpers
People from Hedmark
Sportspeople from Innlandet